List of governors of states of Venezuela. Governors in Venezuela are in charge of the government and administration of each State. A Governor must be a Venezuelan over the age of 25 who is not a member of the clergy. The Governor can be elected for a term of four years by a majority vote. The Governor can be re-elected to an additional term only immediately and only once.

Governors give a yearly public accounting to the State Comptroller for their office, and submit a report on the same to the Legislative Council and the Public Policy Planning and Coordination Council.

In each state exists a Public Policy Planning and Coordination Council, chaired by the Governor with members from the mayors, the state directors of the various ministries and representatives of the legislators elected by the State to the National Assembly, as well as representatives from the Legislative Council, the municipal councils and organized communities, including native communities where they exist.

List by state

Other authorities

Mayors of Metropolitan District of Caracas
The Metropolitan District was created in 1999 and abolished in 2017. See also List of Governors of Federal District of Venezuela.

Heads of Government of the Distrito Capital 
The Head of Government of the Capital District was created in 2009. The Head is appointed by the President of Venezuela.

External links
 CityMayors feature

State governors of Venezuela
Governors of States of Venezuela
State legislatures of Venezuela
State legislatures of Venezuela
States of Venezuela